Every Loser is the nineteenth studio album by American rock singer Iggy Pop, released on January 6, 2023, on Gold Tooth and Atlantic. Produced by Andrew Watt, the album features a core backing band of Chad Smith as drummer and multi-instrumentalists Josh Klinghoffer and Watt.

The album features guest contributions from Jane's Addiction members Dave Navarro, Eric Avery and Chris Chaney, alongside appearances from Guns N' Roses bassist Duff McKagan, Pearl Jam guitarist Stone Gossard, and drummers Taylor Hawkins and Travis Barker.

Background
On October 28, 2022, Pop shared the first single "Frenzy" with contributions from Duff McKagan and Chad Smith. The song was described as "raw" and "energetic". The singer announced the album along with release details on his social media accounts on November 10, 2022. Upon announcing the album, Pop called the collaboration with Watt and Gold Tooth as "old-fashioned". The intention of the album is to "beat the shit out of" the listener.

Critical reception

Every Loser received generally positive reviews from critics. At Metacritic, which assigns a normalized rating out of 100 to reviews from critics, the album received an average score of 79, which indicates "generally favorable reviews", based on seven reviews.

Stuart Berman of Pitchfork wrote, "For Every Loser, [producer] Watt doesn’t try to turn Iggy Pop into something he’s not but rather gives him the space to be every Iggy Pop he wants to be. Over the course of its 11 tracks, we’re treated to a parade of iconic Iggy archetypes: the profane punk, the seedy underworld Sinatra, the Euro-bound futurist, the lovable curmudgeon, and (via the Warhol-inspired comedic interlude “The News for Andy”) the world’s coolest infomercial pitchman. Watt effectively approaches the album as an Iggy jukebox musical — a shiny, over-the-top, but briskly entertaining celebration of its subject — while surrounding him with a supporting cast of acolytes eager to do their hero proud."

Promotion
To promote the album, Pop announced that his backing band would be called The Losers and would consist of Chad Smith, Duff McKagan, Josh Klinghoffer, and Andrew Watt. They performed the song "Frenzy" on Jimmy Kimmel Live! on January 9, 2023.

Track listing

Personnel
Musicians
 Iggy Pop – lead vocals (all tracks), background vocals (tracks 2, 3)
 Andrew Watt – guitar (all tracks), background vocals (1–3, 5, 9, 11), bass guitar (2, 5, 6, 8), keyboards (2, 3, 8, 9, 11), piano (4, 5, 8, 9, 11), sequenced drums (6), percussion (11)
 Duff McKagan – bass guitar (1, 3, 4)
 Chad Smith – drums (1–6, 8), percussion (2–5, 8)
 Josh Klinghoffer – guitar (2, 9, 10), keyboards (2, 8, 10), piano (2, 3, 6, 7), organ (3, 5), bass guitar (7), synthesizer (9)
 Travis Barker – drums (7)
 Stone Gossard – guitar (8)
 Eric Avery – bass guitar (9)
 Taylor Hawkins – drums, percussion, piano (9,11)
 Chris Chaney – bass guitar (11)
 Dave Navarro –  guitar (11)

Technical
 Andrew Watt – production, executive production
 Matt Colton – mastering
 Alan Moulder – mixing
 Marco Sonzini – engineering
 Paul Lamalfa – engineering
 Jimmy Douglass – engineering
 Devon Corey – engineering (3–11), additional engineering (1, 2)
 Tom Herbers – mixing assistance
 Finn Howells – mixing assistance
 Caesar Edmunds – mixing assistance (6)
 Jimmy Davis – additional engineering

Visuals
 Andrew Watt – art direction, photography
 David J. Harrigan III – art direction, design
 Raymond Pettibon – cover art
 Mick Rock – cover photo
 Vincent Guignet – photography
 Spenser Anderson – photography
 Laura Bradley – photography

Charts

References

2023 albums
Iggy Pop albums
Albums produced by Andrew Watt (record producer)
Atlantic Records albums